Theretra insularis is a moth of the family Sphingidae first described by Charles Swinhoe in 1892. It is known from the Philippines, north-eastern Borneo, the Moluccas, Papua New Guinea, the Solomon Islands and Fiji.

Subspecies
Theretra insularis insularis (the Philippines, north-eastern Borneo, Moluccas, Papua New Guinea, Solomon Islands, Fiji Islands)
Theretra insularis ambrymensis Lachlan, 2004 (Ambrym Island)
Theretra insularis lenis Jordan, 1926 (Solomon Islands)
Theretra insularis mollis Jordan, 1926 (St. Matthias Island)
Theretra insularis valens Jordan, 1926 (New Ireland)

References

Theretra
Moths described in 1892